Football ( futbol or votnagndak ) is the most popular sport in Armenia.

, the Armenia national football team is 36th in FIFA World Rankings. Since gaining independence in 1991, Armenia has had its own national association that takes part in all FIFA competitions (Senior, Youth and Women's Football). FC Ararat Yerevan were one of the leading teams in the top league in the Soviet Union, often playing in European club competitions.

A number of Armenian players played for the USSR national team, including Khoren Oganesian at the 1982 FIFA World Cup and Eduard Markarov in the 1960s. Markarov later became assistant coach of the Soviet Union's youth team, and was part of the coaching staff at the FIFA World Youth Championship in Portugal in 1991, when the team finished 3rd.

History

Early period (before 1920s)
In the early 20th century, the first Armenian football clubs were founded in Constantinople, Smyrna and many other cities within the Ottoman Empire.

The first game between Armenian and Turkish teams was recorded in 1906. Armenian club called Balta-Liman (after a neighborhood of Constantinople,  now called Baltalimanı) met with Galatasaray. Later, Balta-Liman was dissolved and two new clubs were founded: Araks and Tork.

However, the break-out of World War I and the Armenian genocide led to a major decline of Armenian involvement in Ottoman sports.

Soviet era (1920s-1991)
Oldest records of football teams in Soviet Armenia goes back to 1926-1927, when the Trans-Caucasian Championship was organized in Tbilisi. Three South Caucasian countries participated: Armenia, Azerbaijan and Georgia.

The first professional club in Armenia was established in 1935 as Spartak and was later renamed Ararat. FC Ararat Yerevan is notable for its wins in the Soviet Championship and the Cup in 1973. FC Ararat also reached the quarter-finals of the 1974–75 European Cup, losing to the eventual champions, Franz Beckenbauer's FC Bayern Munich. The first stadium in Armenia was named Spartak as well,  built in the late 1920s in front of what is now the Yerevan Circus.

In 1958, FC Shirak was founded in Gyumri (then Leninakan), and played in the Soviet First League until Armenia's independence in 1991.

Independent Armenia (1992—present)

Football became the most popular sport in independent Armenia. Armenia became an independent state in 1991, the Armenian SSR having previously played for the Soviet Union national football team. The Football Federation of Armenia was founded on 18 January 1992 and established relations with FIFA in 1992 and with UEFA in 1993. The history of the Armenia national team began on 14 October 1992, when Armenia played its first match against Moldova. That meeting ended in a goalless draw. Since 1996, the team is a member of qualifiers European and World Championships. Armenia has competed in every UEFA Euro qualification and FIFA World Cup qualification since 1994.

However, the lack of financial resources forced many clubs in Yerevan and other provinces to retire from professional football.
As of 2016, only 5 clubs from Yerevan, 1 from Gyumri, 1 from Kapan and 1 from Abovyan are practicing professional football and taking part in the Armenian football league system.

Many new football stadiums were built in Armenia during the 1st decade of the 21st century. However, many of the Soviet-era stadiums are still in bad conditions. Most of the professional clubs either possess their own stadium or football training academy.

Major training centres

Many football academies and training camps are operating in Armenia:

Academies of professional football clubs
 Pyunik Training Centre owned by FC Pyunik, located in Kentron District, Yerevan: is home to 3 natural-grass regular-sized pitches as well as the Pyunik Stadium.
 Banants Training Centre owned by FC Banants, located in Malatia-Sebastia District, Yerevan: is home to 2 natural-grass and 1 artificial turf regular-sized pitches as well as the Banants Stadium.
 Dzoraghbyur Training Centre owned by FC Ararat Yerevan, located in Dzoraghbyur village, Kotayk Province: is home to 3 natural-grass and 1 artificial turf regular-sized pitches.
 Gandzasar Kapan Training Centre owned by Gandzasar Kapan FC, located Kapan, Syunik Province: is home to 1 natural-grass and 1 artificial turf regular-sized pitches.

Academies of the Football Federation of Armenia
 Technical Center-Academy of the Football Federation of Armenia, located in Avan District, Yerevan: is home to 8 natural-grass and 2 artificial turf regular-sized pitches as well as the main stadium.
 Gyumri Football Academy of the Football Federation of Armenia, located in Gyumri, Shirak Province: is home to 4 natural-grass and 2 artificial turf regular-sized pitches.
 Vanadzor Football Academy of the Football Federation of Armenia, located in Vanadzor, Lori Province,  is home to 3 natural-grass and 1 artificial turf regular-sized pitches.
 Vagharshapat Football Academy of the Football Federation of Armenia, located in Vagharshapat, Armavir Province, completed in 2019, is home to 3 natural-grass and 1 artificial turf regular-sized pitches.
 Armavir Football Academy is under construction and expected to be completed by the end of 2020.

Other training centres
 Zepyur Football Training Camp, located in Pyunik village, Kotayk Province: is home to 2 natural-grass regular-sized pitches.
 Tsaghkadzor Olympic Sports Complex in the town of Tsaghkadzor, Kotayk Province, with 2 natural football training fields and other facilities.

National teams

The Armenia national football team is the national football team of Armenia and is controlled by the Football Federation of Armenia. After the dissolution of the Soviet Union, the team played its first international match against Moldova on October 12, 1992.

A women's team, an under-21 team, an under-19 team, and an under-17 team also compete.

League system

2019–20

See also
 List of football clubs in Armenia
 List of football stadiums in Armenia

References

 
Sport in Armenia

lt:Armėnijos futbolo sistema